David C. Wysong (born March 8, 1949) is a former Republican member of the Kansas Senate for the 7th district. He was first elected in 2004. He resigned in December 2009 and was replaced by Terrie Huntington.

Wysong is a Roman Catholic. He was born in Kansas City, Missouri. He received his bachelor's degree in journalism from the University of Kansas in 1972.

By 1979 he was running an advertising agency and in 1990 he became president of Wysong Capital Management. He entered politics in 1996 serving on the city council of Mission Hills, Kansas that year. He was elected to a term as a member of the Johnson County board of commissioners that year as well.

Wysong and his wife Kathy are the parents of two children.

Issue positions
See: David Wysong issue positions on Project Vote Smart

Committee assignments
Wysong serves on these legislative committees:
 Commerce (chair)
 Joint Committee on Economic Development (vice-chair)
 Ethics and Elections
 Public Health and Welfare
 Ways and Means

Sponsored legislation
Recent sponsored bills by Sen. Wysong include:
 A bill regarding increased investments by the State
 A bill imposing restrictions for raising retailers' sales tax
 and multiple bills for regulating insurance

Major Donors
Some of the top contributors to Wysong's 2008 campaign, according to the National Institute on Money in State Politics:
 Steve Glassman, Gary Remley, Fred Couslon, Linda T. Watson, Missouri Bank, and others

Finance, insurance, and real estate companies were his largest donor group.

References

External links
Kansas Senate
Project Vote Smart profile
 Campaign Contributions: 2004, 2006, 2008

1949 births
Living people
Politicians from Kansas City, Missouri
Republican Party Kansas state senators
People from Mission Hills, Kansas
University of Kansas alumni
Catholics from Missouri
Catholics from Kansas
20th-century American politicians
21st-century American politicians
County commissioners in Kansas
Kansas city council members